Cornard Mere is an  biological Site of Special Scientific Interest in Little Cornard in Suffolk. It is managed by the Suffolk Wildlife Trust.

This site has diverse habitats, with fen which is seasonally flooded, ruderal herb vegetation, woodland, grassland and scrub. Flora include water mint, gypsywort, skullcap, ragged robin and southern marsh orchid.

There is access from Bures Road.

References

Suffolk Wildlife Trust
Sites of Special Scientific Interest in Suffolk